Ente Sooryaputhrikku is a 1991 Indian Malayalam-language film directed by Fazil and starring Amala, Srividya, and Suresh Gopi. It was simultaneously shot in Tamil as Karpoora Mullai with Raja replacing Suresh Gopi.

Plot
Maya (Amala) was a spoiled child of a rich man as she always creates issues in her hostel as well as in college. One day along with her friends, she decides to make fun of a Dr. Srinivas (Suresh Gopi / Raja), but the doctor in turn insults her saying that she is a fatherless child. Shocked Maya understands her childish behavior and attempts suicide, but the doctor saves her and she gets back to normal, but starts loving the doctor and she also decide to find out who her father is and finally she discovers that her father had adopted her when she was baby and her biological mother was K. S Vasundhara Devi (Srividya), famous singer. She tries her every bit to make her mom accept her. Finally her mother accepts Maya, but before she make this news to public, Vasundhara Devi is murdered by her administration employees for her wealth. Maya kills her mother's killer's and she is sent to jail. Srinivas marries Maya while she serves her sentence.

Cast 
 Amala as  Maya Vinodini(voiceover by Bhagyalakshmi)
 Srividya as Vasundhara Devi K. S
 Suresh Gopi as  Dr. Srinivas
 Sumithra as Dr. Srinivas's mother
 M. G. Soman as  Vinod Shankar
 Prathapachandran as Shiva Prasad
 T. S. Raghavendra as Balannan
 Bheeman Raghu as  Ravi
 Suma Jayaram
 Kanya Bharathi 
 Kalady Omana
Fazil in a guest appearance
Raja in a guest appearance

Soundtrack 
The highly successful and popular soundtrack was composed by Ilaiyaraja 
Track List

Awards
Kerala State Film Awards 1991
 Best Dubbing Artist - Bhagyalakshmi

Release 
The film was a commercial success.

References

External links 
 

1990s Malayalam-language films
1991 films
Films about adoption
Films directed by Fazil
Films scored by Ilaiyaraaja